

W

 

Wad
Wadalite (mayenite: IMA1987-045) 9.AD.25   [no] (IUPAC: hexacalcium pentaluminium hexadecaoxodisilicate trichloride)
Wadeite (Y: 1939) 9.CA.10    (IUPAC: dipotassium zirconium (nonaoxotrisilicate))
Wadsleyite (IMA1982-012) 9.BE.02    (IUPAC: dimagnesium tetraoxosilicate)
Wagnerite (wagnerite: IMA2003 s.p., 1821 Rd) 8.BB.15    (IUPAC: dimagnesium fluoro phosphate)
Waimirite-(Y) (perovskite: IMA2013-108) 3.0  [no] [no] (IUPAC: yttrium trifluoride)
Waipouaite (IMA2019-095) 9.0  [no] [no]
Wairakite (zeolitic tectosilicate: IMA1997 s.p., 1955) 9.GB.05    (IUPAC: calcium (dialuminotetrasilicate) dodecaoxy dihydrate)
Wairauite (alloy: IMA1964-015) 1.AE.15    (IUPAC: cobalt iron alloy)
Wakabayashilite (IMA1969-024) 2.FA.40   
Wakefieldite (zircon) 8.AD.35 (IUPAC: REE vanadate)
Wakefieldite-(Ce) (IMA1969-001) 8.AD.35   
Wakefieldite-(La) (IMA1989-035a) 8.AD.35   
Wakefieldite-(Nd) (IMA2008-031) 8.AD.35   [no]
Wakefieldite-(Y) (IMA1969-012) 8.AD.35   
Walentaite (IMA1983-047) 8.CH.05    (IUPAC: dihydrogen dicalcium hexairon(III) pentarsenate triphosphate tetradecahydrate)
Walfordite (tellurite: IMA1996-003) 4.JK.05   
Walkerite (IMA2001-051) 6.GB.20   [no]
Wallisite (hatchite: IMA1971 s.p., 1965) 2.GC.05    (CuPbTlAs2S5)
Wallkilldellite 8.DL.20
Wallkilldellite (IMA1982-084) 8.DL.20    (IUPAC: dicalcium trimanganese(II) tetrahydro diarsenate nonahydrate)
Wallkilldellite-(Fe) (IMA1997-032) 8.DL.20   [no] (IUPAC: dicalcium triiron(II) tetrahydro diarsenate nonahydrate)
Walpurgite (Y: 1871) 8.EA.05    (IUPAC: tetra(oxo bismutate) uranyl diarsenate dihydrate)
Walstromite (IMA1964-009) 9.CA.25    (IUPAC: barium dicalcium nonaoxytrisilicate)
Walthierite (alunite, alunite: IMA1991-008) 7.BC.10    (IUPAC: barium hexaaluminium dodecahydro tetrasulfate)
Wampenite (IMA2015-061) 10.B?.  [no] [no]
Wangdaodeite (IMA2016-007) 4.0  [no] [no] (IUPAC: iron titanium trioxide)
Wardite (wardite: 1896) 8.DL.10    (IUPAC: sodium trialuminium tetrahydro diphosphate dihydrate)
Wardsmithite (IMA1967-030) 6.H0.25    (IUPAC: pentacalcium magnesium hexa(heptaoxotetraborate) triacontahydrate)
Warikahnite (IMA1978-038) 8.CA.35    (IUPAC: trizinc diarsenate dihydrate)
Warkite (sapphirine: IMA2013-129) 4.0  [no] [no] (IUPAC: dicalcium hexascandium hexaluminium icosaoxide)
Warwickite (warwickite: 1838) 6.AB.20   
Wassonite (IMA2010-074) 2.CB.    (IUPAC: titanium(II) sulfide)
Watanabeite (IMA1991-025) 2.GC.15    )
Watatsumiite (neptunite: IMA2001-043) 9.EH.05   [no]
Waterhouseite (IMA2004-035) 8.BE.85    (IUPAC: heptamanganese octahydro diphosphate)
Watkinsonite (watkinsonite: IMA1985-024) 2.HB.20e    (PbCu2Bi4(Se,S)8)
Wattersite (IMA1987-030) 7.FB.15    (IUPAC: di(dimercury) mercury(II) dioxochromate)
WattevilleiteQ (Y: 1879) 7.CC.85    Note: possibly hexahydrite.
Wavellite (IMA1971 s.p., 1805) 8.DC.50    (IUPAC: trialuminium trihydro diphosphate pentahydrate)
Wawayandaite (IMA1988-043) 9.HA.20   
Waylandite (alunite, crandallite: IMA1962-003) 8.BL.13    (IUPAC: bismuth trialuminium hexahydro diphosphate)
Wayneburnhamite (IMA2015-124) 9.B?.  [no] [no] (IUPAC: nonalead hexacalcium tri(heptaoxodisilicate) tri(tetraoxosilicate))
Weberite (Y: 1938) 3.CB.25    (IUPAC: disodium magnesium heptafluoroaluminate)
Weddellite (oxalate: 1936) 10.AB.40    (IUPAC: calcium oxalate dihydrate)
Weeksite (IMA1962 s.p., 1960) 9.AK.30    (IUPAC: dipotassium diuranyl tridecaoxopentasilicate tetrahydrate)
Wegscheiderite (IMA1967 s.p., 1961) 5.AA.30    (IUPAC: pentasodium trihydrogen tetracarbonate)
Weibullite (kobellite: IMA1980 s.p., 1910 Rd) 2.JB.25h    (Ag0.33Pb5.33Bi8.33(S,Se)18)
Weilerite (alunite, beudandite: IMA1987 s.p., 1962 Rd) 8.0   [no] (IUPAC: barium trialuminium hexahydro sulfate arsenate) Note: it is definitely not a synonym of arsenogorceixite as its sulfate content is now known.
Weilite (IMA1963-006) 8.AD.10    (IUPAC: (calcium hydroxoarsenate(V))
Weinebeneite (beryllophosphate zeolite: IMA1990-049) 8.DA.20    (IUPAC: calcium triberyllium dihydro diphosphate tetrahydrate)
Weishanite (amalgam: IMA1982-076) 1.AD.20a   
Weissbergite (IMA1975-040) 2.HD.05    (IUPAC: thallium disulfa antimonide)
Weissite (Y: 1927) 2.BA.30    
Welinite (IMA1966-002 Rd) 9.AF.75    
Weloganite (IMA1967-042) 5.CC.05    (IUPAC: disodium tristrontium zirconium hexacarbonate trihydrate)
Welshite (sapphirine: IMA1973-019) 9.DH.40   
Wendwilsonite (IMA1985-047) 8.CG.10    (IUPAC: dicalcium magnesium diarsenate dihydrate)
Wenjiite (phosphide: IMA2019-107c) 1.BO.  [no] [no]
Wenkite (tectosilicate zeolite: IMA1967 s.p., 1962) 9.GD.25   
Werdingite (IMA1988-023) 9.BD.35    (IUPAC: dimagnesium tetralumino tetraboro heptatriacontaoxotetrasilicate)
Wermlandite (hydrotalcite: IMA1970-007) 7.DD.35   
Wernerbaurite (decavanadate: IMA2012-064) 4.0  [no] 
Wernerkrauseite (post-spinel: IMA2014-008) 4.0  [no] [no]
Wesselsite (gillespite: IMA1994-055) 9.EA.05   [no] (IUPAC: strontium copper decaoxotetrasilicate)
Westerveldite (modderite: IMA1971-017) 2.CC.15    (IUPAC: iron arsenide)
Wetherillite (IMA2014-044) 7.0  [no] [no] (IUPAC: disodium magnesium diuranyl tetrasulfate octadecahydrate)
Wheatleyite (oxalate: IMA1984-040) 10.AB.30    (IUPAC: disodium copper oxalate dihydrate)
Whelanite (IMA1977-006) 9.0  [no] [no]
Wherryite (Y: 1950) 7.BC.55   [no] (IUPAC: heptalead dicopper tetrasulfate di(tetraoxosilicate) dihydroxyl)
Whewellite (oxalate: IMA1967 s.p., 1852) 10.AB.45    (IUPAC: calcium oxalate monohydrate)
Whitecapsite (IMA2012-030) 7.0  [no] 
Whiteite (jahnsite, whiteite) 8.DH.15 (IUPAC: (tri M(II)) dialuminium dihydro diphosphate octahydrate)
Whiteite-(CaFeMg) (IMA1975-001) 8.DH.15   
Whiteite-(CaMgMg) (IMA2016-001) 8.DH.15  [no] [no]
Whiteite-(CaMnMg) (IMA1986-012) 8.DH.15   
Whiteite-(CaMnMn) (IMA2011-002) 8.DH.15  [no] 
Whiteite-(MnFeMg) (IMA78-A) 8.DH.15   
Whiteite-(MnMnMg) (IMA2015-092) 8.DH.15  [no] [no]
Whiteite-(MnMnMn) (IMA2021-049) 8.DH.15 [no] [no] [no]
Whiterockite (IMA2020-044) 8.0  [no] [no]
Whitlockite (whitlockite: 1941) 8.AC.45    (IUPAC: nonacalcium magnesium hydroxophosphate(V) hexaphosphate)
Whitmoreite (arthurite: IMA1974-009) 8.DC.15    (IUPAC: iron(II) diiron(III) dihydro diphosphate tetrahydrate)
Wickenburgite (IMA1968-006) 9.EG.55    (IUPAC: trilead calcium dialumino heptaicosaoxodecasilicate tetrahydrate)
Wickmanite (schoenfliesite: IMA1965-024) 4.FC.10    (IUPAC: manganese(II) tin(IV) hexahydroxide)
Wicksite (wicksite: IMA1979-019) 8.CF.05   
Widenmannite (IMA1974-008) 5.ED.40    (IUPAC: dilead dihydro [uranyl dicarbonate])
Widgiemoolthalite (IMA1992-006) 5.DA.05    (IUPAC: pentanickel tetracarbonate dihydro (tetra-penta)hydrate)
Wightmanite (IMA1967 s.p., 1962) 6.AB.55    (IUPAC: pentamagnesium pentahydro oxo(trioxoborate) dihydrate)
Wiklundite (IMA2015-057) 4.0  [no] [no]
Wilancookite (beryllophosphate zeolite: IMA2015-034) 8.0  [no] [no]
Wilcoxite (aubertite: IMA1979-070) 7.DE.45    (IUPAC: magnesium aluminium disulfate fluoride heptadecahydrate)
Wildenauerite (IMA2017-058) 8.0  [no] [no]
Wilhelmgümbelite (schoonerite, calcioferrite: IMA2015-072) 8.0  [no] [no]
Wilhelmkleinite (IMA1997-034) 8.BB.40    (IUPAC: zinc diiron(III) dihydro diarsenate)
Wilhelmramsayite (lazulite: IMA2004-033) 2.FD.40   [no] (IUPAC: tricopper iron trisulfide dihydrate)
Wilhelmvierlingite (overite: IMA1982-025) 8.DH.20    (IUPAC: calcium manganese(II) iron(III) hydro diphosphate dihydrate)
Wilkinsonite (sapphirine: IMA1988-053) 9.DH.40    (IUPAC: tetrasodium [octairon(II) tetrairon(III)] tetraoxo[hexatriacontaoxoicosasilicate]
Wilkmanite (IMA1967 s.p., 1964) 2.D0.15    (IUPAC: trinickel tetraselenide)
Willemite (phenakite: 1830) 9.AA.05    (IUPAC: dizinc tetraoxosilicate)
Willemseite (talc: IMA1971 s.p., 1969) 9.EC.05    (IUPAC: trinickel dihydroxyl decaoxytetrasilicate)
Willhendersonite (zeolitic tectosilicate: IMA1981-030) 9.GD.10    (IUPAC: potassium calcium (trialuminotrisilicate) dodecaoxy pentahydrate)
Willyamite (cobaltite: IMA1970 s.p., IMA1969-001a Rd) 2.EB.25    (IUPAC: cobalt sulfantimonide)
Wiluite (vesuvianite: IMA1997-026) 9.BG.35   [no]
Winchite [Na-Ca-amphibole: IMA2012 s.p., 1906 Rd] 9.DE.20   
Windhoekite (palygorskite: IMA2010-083) 9.EE.20  [no] [no]
Windmountainite (palygorskite: IMA2018-130a) 9.EE.  [no] [no]
Winstanleyite (tellurite: IMA1979-001) 4.JK.05    (IUPAC: titanium tritellurium(IV) octaoxide)
Wiserite (Y: 1845) 6.BA.20   
Witherite (aragonite: 1784) 5.AB.15    (IUPAC: barium carbonate)
Wittichenite (Y: 1853) 2.GA.20    (IUPAC: tricopper bismuth trisulfide)
WittiteQ (Y: 1924) 2.JB.20    Note: possibly Se-rich cannizzarite.
Witzkeite (IMA2011-084) 7.0  [no] [no] (IUPAC: tetrasodium tetrapotassium calcium dinitrate tetrasulfate dihydrate)
Wodegongjieite (IMA2020-036b)
Wodginite (wodginite: IMA1967 s.p., 1963) 4.DB.40    (IUPAC: manganese(II) tin(IV) ditantalum octaoxide)
Wöhlerite (wöhlerite: 1843) 9.BE.17   
Wolfeite (wagnerite: 1949) 8.BB.15    (IUPAC: diiron(II) hydro phosphate)
Wollastonite (wollastonite: IMA1962 s.p., 1818) 9.DG.05    (IUPAC: calcium trioxysilicate)
Wölsendorfite (wölsendorfite: 1957) 4.GB.30    (IUPAC: heptalead tetradecauranyl tetrahydro nonadecaoxide dodecahydrate)
Wonesite (mica: IMA1979-007a) 9.EC.20   
Woodallite (hydrotalcite: IMA2000-042) 4.FL.05    (IUPAC: hexamagnesium dichromium hexadecahydroxide dichloride tetrahydrate)
Woodhouseite (alunite, beudandite: IMA1987 s.p., 1937 Rd) 8.BL.05    (IUPAC: calcium trialuminium hexahydro sulfate phosphate)
Woodruffite (Y: 1953) 4.FL.25    (IUPAC: dizinc penta(manganese(IV),manganese(III)) decaoxide tetrahydrate)
Woodwardite (hydrotalcite: 1866) 7.DD.35   
Wooldridgeite (IMA1997-037) 8.FC.25    (IUPAC: disodium calcium dicopper(II) dipyrophosphate decahydrate)
Wopmayite (whitlockite: IMA2011-093) 8.AC.  [no] 
Wrightite (IMA2015-120) 8.0  [no] [no] (IUPAC: dipotassium dialuminium oxodiarsenate)
Wroewolfeite (IMA1973-064) 7.DD.10    (IUPAC: tetracopper hexahydro sulfate dihydrate)
Wulfenite (scheelite: 1845) 7.GA.05    (IUPAC: lead molybdenum tetraoxide)
Wulffite (IMA2013-035) 7.0   [no] (IUPAC: tripotassium sodium tetracopper dioxo tetrasulfate)
Wülfingite (cristobalite: IMA1983-070) 4.FA.10    (IUPAC: zinc dihydroxide)
Wupatkiite (halotrichite: IMA1994-019) 7.CB.85    (IUPAC: cobalt dialuminium tetrasulfate docosahydrate)
Wurtzite (wurtzite: 1861) 2.CB.45    (IUPAC: zinc sulfide)
Wüstite (Y: 1927) 4.AB.25    (IUPAC: iron(II) oxide)
Wumuite (IMA2017-067a) 4.0  [no] [no]
Wuyanzhiite (IMA2017-081) 2.0  [no] [no]
Wyartite (IMA1962 s.p., 1959) 5.EA.15    (IUPAC: calcium uranium(V) diuranyl tetraoxyhydro carbonate heptahydrate)
Wycheproofite (IMA1993-024) 8.DJ.30    (IUPAC: sodium aluminium zirconium dihydro diphosphate monohydrate)
Wyllieite (alluaudite, wyllieite: IMA1972-015) 8.AC.15   

X
Xanthiosite (olivine: IMA1965 s.p., 1858 Rd) 8.AB.25    (IUPAC: trinickel diarsenate)
Xanthoconite (Y: 1840) 2.GA.10    (IUPAC: trisilver trisulfa arsenide)
Xanthoxenite (IMA1975-004a, 1920 Rd) 8.DH.40    (IUPAC: tetracalcium diiron(III) dihydro tetraphosphate trihydrate)
Xenophyllite (IMA2006-006) 8.AC.50   [no] (IUPAC: tetrasodium heptairon hexaphosphate)
Xenotime (zircon) 8.AD.35 (IUPAC: REE phosphate)
Xenotime-(Y) (IMA1987 s.p., 1832) 8.AD.35   
Xenotime-(Yb) (IMA1998-049) 8.AD.35   [no]
Xiangjiangite (IMA1982 s.p., 1978) 8.EB.05    (IUPAC: iron(III) tetrauranyl hydro diphosphate disulfate docosahydrate)
Xieite (post-spinel: IMA2007-056) 4.BB.25   [no] (IUPAC: iron(II) dichromium tetraoxide)
Xifengite (silicide: IMA1983-086) 1.BB.40    (IUPAC: pentairon trisilicide)
Xilingolite (lillianite: IMA1982-024) 2.JB.40a    (Pb3Bi2S6)
Ximengite (rhabdophane: IMA1985-004) 8.AD.45    (IUPAC: bismuth phosphate)
XingzhongiteQ (spinel, linnaeite: 1976) 2.DA.05    Note: possibly cuproiridsite.
Xitieshanite (IMA1982-044) 7.DC.20    (IUPAC: iron(III) chloro sulfate hexahydrate)
Xocolatlite (tellurium oxysalt: IMA2007-020) 7.DF.85   [no] (IUPAC: dicalcium dimanganese(IV) dodecaoxoditellurate(VI) monohydrate)
Xocomecatlite (IMA1974-048) 7.BB.50    (IUPAC: tricopper tetrahydro tetraoxotellurate(VI))
Xonotlite (y: 1866) 9.DG.35    (IUPAC: hexacalcium heptadecaoxohexasilicate dihydroxyl)
Xuwenyuanite (IMA2021-080)  [no] [no]

External links
IMA Database of Mineral Properties/ RRUFF Project
Mindat.org - The Mineral Database
Webmineral.com
Mineralatlas.eu minerals W and X